Sonnemans is a surname. Notable people with the surname include:

 Ben Sonnemans (born 1972), Dutch judoka
 Victor Sonnemans (1874–1962), Belgian Olympic water polo player

Surnames of Dutch origin